James Golding (born 19 January 1996) is an Australian racing driver who competes in the Repco Supercars Championship driving the No. 31 Holden ZB Commodore for PremiAir Racing.

Career

Early career

A multiple Victorian karting champion, Golding moved into the Victorian Formula Ford championship in 2013, finishing fourth. He then stepped up to the national series in 2014, where he finished third despite only being eight points shy of the overall winner, Thomas Randle.

Supercars
He caught the attention of Garry Rogers, who signed him into his Dunlop Series team for the 2015 season. In his debut season, he finished tenth in the overall standings, beating season regulars such as Aaren Russell and Paul Morris, as well as other rising talents like Macauley Jones.

In 2016, he was drafted into the main series for the endurance events, driving alongside James Moffat in the Volvo S60. In his debut race, the 2016 Wilson Security Sandown 500, Golding crashed heavily on the first lap after the front right tyre deflated at high speed.

Racing record

Career results

Supercars Championship results

Bathurst 1000 results

Complete S5000 results

References

External links
 Profile on Driver Database
 Profile on Racing Reference
 Profile on Supercars webpage
 News, pictures & videos on Motorport.com

1996 births
Formula Ford drivers
Living people
Supercars Championship drivers
Australian racing drivers
People from Warragul
Sportsmen from Victoria (Australia)
Garry Rogers Motorsport drivers
Tasman Series drivers
21st-century Australian people